45 The Shambles is an historic building in the English city of York, North Yorkshire.

The building was constructed of brick in the early 18th century.  The front, on The Shambles, was altered in about 1800, and has one window on each of the two upper storeys.  The ground floor has a late 19th century shopfront.  The interior has been altered and does not retain original features.

Since 2009, the shop has housed the Shambles Sausage & Pie Company.

References

45
Houses in North Yorkshire
Buildings and structures in North Yorkshire
18th-century establishments in England
Grade II listed buildings in York
Grade II listed houses
18th century in York